The 2019-20 Providence Friars Men's ice hockey season was the 69th season of play for the program and the 36th season in the Hockey East conference. The Friars represented Providence College and were coached by Nate Leaman, in his 9th season.

The Hockey East tournament as well as the NCAA Tournament were cancelled due to the COVID-19 pandemic before any games were played.

Current roster
As of August 1, 2019.

Standings

Schedule and Results

|-
!colspan=12 style=";" | Regular Season

|- 
!colspan=12 style=";" | 

|-
!colspan=12 style=";" | 

|- 
!colspan=12 style=";" | 
|- align="center" bgcolor="#e0e0e0"
|colspan=12|Tournament Cancelled

Scoring Statistics

Goaltending statistics

Rankings

Players drafted into the NHL

2020 NHL Entry Draft

† incoming freshman

References

Providence Friars men's ice hockey seasons
Providence Friars 
Providence Friars 
2019 in sports in Rhode Island
2020 in sports in Rhode Island